The British Rail Class 421 (4CIG) electric multiple units were built at BR's Holgate Road carriage works between 1964 and 1972. Units were built in two batches, and were initially introduced on services on the Brighton Main Line. Later units were introduced on services to Portsmouth. These units replaced older Southern Railway-designed units, such as the 5Bel "Brighton Belle" units, and 4Cor units. The fleet's lifespan was 46 years.

Standard units
The standard units contained only passenger accommodation, and formed the bulk of the fleet. They were unusual in that all four traction motors were mounted on one non-driving motor coach. Units consisted of two driving trailers, sandwiching the non-driving motor coach and an intermediate trailer.

Units were built in two batches. 'Phase 1' units were built from 1963 to 1966 for the Brighton Line, and were numbered 7301-7336. These were followed in 1970-72 by the 'Phase 2' units, built primarily for the Portsmouth line, numbered 7337-7438.

4Big units
The 4Big units were similar to the standard units, but contained a buffet car in place of the intermediate trailer.

These units were also built in two batches. 'Phase 1' units were built in 1965/66, and were numbered 7031-48. 'Phase 2' units were built in 1970, and were numbered 7049-7058.

The 4Big fleet were initially classified as Class 420 by British Rail under the TOPS system introduced in 1968, and then Class 422.

Vehicle numbering
The numbering of individual vehicles and details of when units were built are shown in the table below.

Refurbishment
Units were facelifted between 1986 and 1993.

8Mig units
In 1983, two temporary 8Mig units, given the TOPS classification Class 482 and numbered 2601–2602, were formed while the 4Big fleet underwent asbestos removal. They were used on the Portsmouth Direct line. Therefore, four standard 'Phase 2' 4Cig units, numbers 7401–7404, were reformed with a conventional locomotive-hauled miniature buffet carriage (RMB). Each 8Mig unit was formed by marshalling the RMB coach in between two units, one of which was reduced to three carriages, with the removal of the intermediate trailer (TSO). Thus in effect each 8Mig unit was effectively formed of 4Cig + RMB + 3Cig. The formations of the units are listed below:

These units were only used during the summer of 1983, after which enough asbestos-free 4Big units were available. The two 8Mig units were disbanded and the four 4Cig unit reformed. The 4Cig units have since been renumbered several times, as shown below:

8Dig units
In 1992 four 8Dig units, numbered 2001-2004, were formed by semi-permanently coupling a 4Cig and a 4Big unit. The units were dedicated to London Victoria to Brighton express services, which were operated as the Capital–Coast Express.

The 8Dig units were formed from four 'Phase 2' 4Big units plus two 'Phase 1' and two 'Phase 2' 4Cig units. The 'Phase 1' units, numbers 1901/02 (recently renumbered from 1715/16), were fitted with Mk.6 motor bogies. One of the 'Phase 2' 4Cig units, no. 1875 (ex. 7404), had previously been part of 8Mig unit 2602. Unit formations are listed below:

The units were disbanded in 1996, after replacement by dedicated Class 319/2 units. The various 4Cig and 4Big units were reformed and gained their original numbers, except unit 1875, which was renumbered to 1802.

Final years of operation

Two units had remained in service until 22 May 2010, 3Cig units nos. 1497 and 1498, which were used on the Lymington Branch Line. These two units were withdrawn from service on 22 May 2010 and replaced by Class 158 Diesel Multiple Units. Towards the end of their life, with the increasing use of newer trains which were equipped with sliding or plug doors, these trains were known commonly as "slam-door trains".  1497 is now preserved at The Mid Norfolk Railway and 1498 is now preserved on the Epping Ongar Railway. The latter has had an extra carriage added to restore its original 4Cig formation.

Privatisation to withdrawal

After rail privatisation in the mid-1990s the different divisions of British Rail were divided up into different franchises. The three former SR division – South-Eastern, South Central and South-Western – all operated 4Cig units, and are dealt with separately here.

South Eastern Trains
South Eastern Trains (SET) operated a small fleet of three 'Phase 1' and 22 'Phase 2' 4Cig units. The franchise was originally operated by Connex South Eastern.

All but one of the 'Phase 2' units continued to carry the obsolete Network SouthEast livery. One unit, no. 1870, was repainted into Connex South Eastern yellow and white. The three 'Phase 1' units were painted in white undercoat livery, since their use was originally only supposed to be short-term. However, despite this, the units remained in traffic for seven more years, from 1997 to 2004. They were popularly known as "Ghosts" by rail enthusiasts.

From 2003 units started to be withdrawn, having been replaced by the second batch of the new "Electrostar" units. The three 'Phase 1' units had gone by mid-2004. The final unit, no. 1843, lingered on for several months longer than its classmates, eventually being withdrawn in mid-November 2004. All the SET units have been scrapped.

South Central / Southern
The South Central Division inherited the largest fleet of 4Cig units. Originally this included all remaining 'Phase 1' units (though some were later transferred to South Eastern Trains), 35 'Phase 2' units, and the four 8Dig units. The remaining few 4Big units were also used on the former Central Division.

The South Central franchise was initially won by Connex South Central, which applied its yellow and white livery to most stock. In 2000 it lost the franchise to the Go-Ahead Group, which operated the franchise as South Central. In 2004 this was changed to Southern. Four 'Phase 1' units (nos. 1735/38/40, 1908) and eight 'Phase 2' units (nos. 1854/56-62) received Southern's new green livery.

In 1997 the remaining 4Big units were withdrawn. Eight were transferred to South West Trains. The remaining eleven unit were heavily rebuilt at Eastleigh Works, with compartments removed and opened out, and the buffet carriages withdrawn. The modified units were reclassified as Class 421/7 and renumbered into the 1401–1411 range. The units were also known as 3Cop units, which denoted their intended use, i.e. dedicated to East Coastway and West Coastway services out of Brighton. Two units received names – a rarity for slam-door EMU stock.
1408 - Littlehampton Progress 2000
1409 - Operation Perseus
In 2004 some units were augmented to four carriages with the addition of a 'Phase 1' intermediate trailer, and thus became 4Cop units.

From 2003 Southern started to replace its slam-door fleet with new Class 377 Electrostar units. In general the 'Phase 1' units were withdrawn first due to their age, but as deliveries of the Electrostars increased some 'Phase 2' units were also taken out of service. By late 2004 only a handful of 'Phase 1' units and 4Cops remained in service. The final 'Phase 1' units in traffic were nos. 1704/08/11/12/14/17/43 and 1901, with the final unit, no. 1704, being withdrawn in February 2005. The final 4Cop units, nos. 1404/10/11, were withdrawn in March 2005.

The 'Phase 2' units lasted longer and two, nos. 1805 and 1866, were retained beyond August 2005, when slam-door trains lost all diagrammed work. They lasted until 19 November 2005, when they worked a farewell railtour, following which they were withdrawn.

South West Trains

South West Trains inherited a small fleet of twelve 'Phase 2' 4Cig units, and the larger fleet of 22 "Greyhound" units which had been modified to cut several minutes from journey times on the Portsmouth Direct line with its 1 in 80 gradients by adding a second stage of field weakening to improve performance at higher speeds (17% at 54 mph, 30% at 90 mph).

In 1997 the fleet was augmented with the addition of eight 4Big units from Connex South Central. These operated with the counter in the buffet carriages locked out of use. By 1999 these units had been stored, but then eight additional "Greyhound" units were converted from the redundant 4Bigs. The units were reclassified as Class 421/8, and renumbered in the range 1392–1399. The modifications included the removal of the buffet carriages, which were replaced by spare intermediate trailers from mechanically similar 4Cep units. Most of these trailers came from 4Cep units to make 3Cep units, but a few came from withdrawn units. These trailers were immediately recognisable since although they had the same body profile as the rest of the unit the windows were different and they had InterCity70 seating. The buffet carriages were withdrawn, although many were saved for preservation.

In December 2004 unit no. 1394 was reduced to a three-car unit with the removal of its Cep trailer. It was reclassified as Class 421/7, renumbered 1499, and dedicated to the Lymington Branch Line service, where it replaced the previous incumbent unit, no. 1198.

Withdrawals of units started in mid-2004, when many new Class 444 and Class 450 "Desiro" units became available for service. By the end of 2004 just a handful of units remained in traffic. The final few units were withdrawn in May 2005, with the last in traffic being 1304/09/12/16, 1392/95/96/97/98, 1499 and 1881/90. The final slam-door service ran on 26 May from London Waterloo to Bournemouth using units 1396, 1398 and 4Vep 3536. Following withdrawal two units, nos. 1304 and 1881, were transferred to "warm storage" for use by Southern if required. Most of the other units were sent for scrap, with the exception of nos. 1392 and 1499.

Services on the Lymington Branch Line were operated as a "heritage" operation using one of two refurbished 3Cig units, nos. 1497 and 1498. The two units were launched into service on 12 May 2005 having been repainted into heritage liveries, 1497 in blue and grey and 1498 in the green that the units carried when built. However, in May 2010, the new timetable changes saw the units replaced for more modern stock to save maintenance on a non-standard fleet of two units. As stated in the relevant timetable, "The slam door trains will be remembered with affection as they pass into history." The change took place on 22 May 2010 and the units have been replaced by a Class 158 on weekdays and a Class 450 Desiro at weekends. The class 421s have both been preserved due to historic significance.

Accidents and incidents

On 15 December 1971, a Cardiff to Portsmouth Harbour train hauled by Hymek diesel no. D7013 collided with unit 7303 on the high level section of Portsmouth and Southsea station, Hampshire. Sixteen passengers and railway staff were injured
In summer 1974 (date unknown) unit 7346 ran away at Wimbledon Park and hit a flyover causing extensive damage to the cab of vehicle 76620.
On 26 January 1985, unit 7395 formed a train with 4VEP units 7754 and 7703 which was halted by a landslip near Popham, Hampshire and was run into by Class 33 locomotive 33 104 due to the train crew failing to protect the stranded train. Twelve people were injured and the Class 33 was written off.
On 6 November 1985, unit 7390 collided with 4VEP unit 7724 at Copyhold Junction, near , West Sussex due to poor rail conditions and a loss of braking. Forty people were injured.

Five people were killed, 8 were injured.
There were no injuries.
On 1 August 1990, Class 119 diesel multiple unit L576 collided with a passenger train comprising 4VEP units 3508 & 3504, and 4CIG unit 1304 at  due to overrunning signals. Forty people were injured.

Further use
Following withdrawal from normal service several vehicles have seen further use in departmental service.
3Cop unit 1401 was employed as depot shunter at Ashford Chart Leacon depot. However, it was made redundant when Chart Leacon stopped overhauls of slam-door stock and was sent for scrap in July 2005.
MBS 62356 (ex-unit 1850) was converted into an ultrasonic test train vehicle for use by Network Rail. It has been renumbered 999606. 
The rest of unit 1850, namely DTC 76629, TS 71036 and DTC 76789, were retained by Network Rail to provide spares for 999606 but have now been scrapped by C.F. Booth in Rotherham.
One vehicle, no. 76112 from 'Phase 1' 4Cig unit 1749, was rebuilt as the Class 424 "Networker Classic" prototype in 1997. It was displayed to the public at London Victoria, paired with unrebuilt driving trailer 76747 from 4Big unit 2256, for comparison purposes. The project was shelved and the vehicle was scrapped in early 2012.
 DTCSoL vehicles 76765 and 76836 (from 1882) plus 76775 and 76846 (from 1890) were released recently by HSBC from Shoeburyness for parts stripping at Derby RTC, after which they went to C.F. Booth.

Preservation
Only two units have been preserved in addition numerous buffet cars from 4Big units have also been preserved. The full list is shown below, with complete units highlighted:
'Phase 1' unit 1753 has been preserved by the Network SouthEast Railway Society and is stored at Nemesis Rail, Burton Upon Trent.
'Phase 2' unit 1497 is preserved on the Spa Valley Railway.

Former preserved CIGs include:
'Phase 2' unit 1304, Scrapped by the Brighton Belle Preservation Trust. 
'Phase 2' "Greyhound" unit 1392, scrapped by the Brighton Belle Preservation Trust. (MBSO in extremely stripped condition survives as a shell) 
'Phase 2' "Greyhound" unit 1393, scrapped by the Great Central Railway, MBSO in use with Network Rail. 
'Phase 2' "Greyhound" unit 1399, partially component recovered by owner in 2016 to provide spares float for "4-VOP" Unit 3905 and other projects. Unit was used in filming of 'Last Passenger' 
'Phase 2' unit 1498, exported to Ireland for use as 'Glamping' accommodation.
'Phase 2' unit 1499, Scrapped by the Dean Forest Railway. 
'Phase 2' unit 1881, Scrapped by the Brighton Belle Preservation Trust. (One DTS remains at Barrow Hill) 
'Phase 2' unit 1884, Scrapped by the Brighton Belle Preservation Trust

No Greyhound Units survive. 
No 8MIG or 8DIG units survive.

Preserved units

Fleet details

Original-condition Units

Facelifted units

Diagrams

References

Further reading

421
Train-related introductions in 1964
750 V DC multiple units